Scholes International Airport at Galveston  is three miles southwest of Galveston, in Galveston County, Texas, United States. The National Plan of Integrated Airport Systems for 2011–2015 categorized it as a reliever airport.

The airport provides charter service and has no scheduled flights; the runways can accommodate airplanes as large as the Boeing 767-200.

Overview 
Operated and maintained by the City of Galveston, GLS is a general aviation airport. It has seen several airlines; from the 1930s until 1953-54 Braniff flew to Houston International (later named William P. Hobby Airport). Trans-Texas Airways "TTa", the forerunner to Texas International Airlines, arrived in the 1950s; until 1972 TTa Convair 600s flew nonstop to both Houston and Beaumont/Port Arthur and direct to Dallas and Austin. Later Galveston was served by Houston Metro Airlines De Havilland of Canada DHC-6 Twin Otters to Houston Intercontinental Airport (IAH), some stopping at Clear Lake City (CLC airport) near the NASA Johnson Space Center.  A commuter airline, Texas Airlines, also served the airport in the mid-1980s with Piper Navajos to Houston Intercontinental Airport.

The airport's Master Plan considers the potential return of airline service as well as the trend of corporate aircraft and oil industry helicopter activity. It can now accommodate aircraft as large as a Boeing 767.

GLS has air traffic control 12 hours a day (0600-1800), with direct clearance delivery service to Houston TRACON after the tower is closed. The Class D surface area changes to Class E and airport is uncontrolled. Airport lighting includes HIRL, MIRL, MALSR, REIL's and PAPI's as well as  lighted taxiway and runway signage. It has an "A" ARFF Index. The  airport offers a terminal, a 24-hour fixed-base operator, 24-hour weather services, a U.S. Customs agent on call, and state-of-the-art navigational aids with precision approaches providing all-weather capabilities. It is a fairly popular fueling stop for transient military aircraft due to a Military Operations Area in the Gulf of Mexico, and it is the destination for air ambulances transferring patients to the Shriner's Burn Hospital for Children.

Of the 220+ aircraft based at GLS, 50+ are helicopters belonging to Bristow, Era, PHI and other oil industry vendors.

The Lone Star Flight Museum was at the airport from 1985 until 2017.

GLS ATIS Freq: 119.275, Phone Number: (409) 740-9248 ASOS

History 
In the early 1920s the present Galveston airport location began to be used for aircraft operations, by Bob Scholes and Fen Waters, among others), who were some of the earliest aircraft operators in Texas (both of whom were flying before the issuance of pilot licenses. Soon after, the City of Galveston ordered them to cease providing rides and aerobatic demonstrations, in their Hisso-Suiza converted, former OX-5 powered Standard for which they were using East Beach as a runway surface. Fen Waters was offered the use of what is the present airport property, by a friend whose family operated a cattle ranch and watermelon farm.

The Galveston Municipal Airport name dates back to 1931. For a time it was named Corrigan Airport in 1938 for Douglas "Wrong Way" Corrigan, a Galveston native.

During World War II, it was re-designated a United States Army Air Corps base and named "Galveston Army Air Field", United States Army Corps of Engineers, using funds made available by Congress through the Civil Aeronautics Authority, constructed three -long, hard-surface runways at the airport to accommodate army aircraft.

In January 1943, Galveston Army Air Field was officially activated had the 46th Bombardment Group flying the Douglas A-20 Havoc in the anti-submarine role in the Gulf of Mexico until replaced by the 10th Antisubmarine Squadron, flying RM-37 Lockheed Venturas.

The Field was primarily used for replacement crew gunnery training by the 407th Fighter-Bomber Group, with targets being towed to the gunnery range at nearby Oyster Bay. The installation cost $7 million and at its peak had some 2,500 personnel assigned.

It was deactivated on November 15, 1945, with ownership reverting to the City of Galveston. The existing terminal was completed in 1949 and renamed Scholes Field in honor of Airport Manager and aviation pioneer, Robert "Bob" Scholes. As late as 1948, it was an active seaplane base per Sectional Aeronautical chart SA SAC O-5.

The airport has in the past offered airline services to Houston on Texas International Airlines.

Facilities
Scholes International Airport covers 966 acres (391 ha) at an elevation of 6 feet (2 m). It has two runways: 14/32 is 6,000 by 150 feet (1,829 x 46 m) asphalt/concrete; 18/36 is 6,001 by 150 feet (1,829 x 46 m) concrete.

In the year ending June 3, 2011 the airport had 61,087 aircraft operations, average 167 per day: 55% air taxi, 44% general aviation and 1% military. In August 2017, 109 aircraft were based at the airport: 75 single-engine, 15 multi-engine, 2 jet, 14 helicopter, 1 glider and 2 ultralight.

Regular traffic 
Light general aviation aircraft, and the occasional transient business jets can be seen at GLS.

The most frequent traffic is that of the helicopters that support the offshore oil and gas  industry operating in the Gulf of Mexico. These large Part 135 helicopter operators include:

 Bristow U.S. LLC flying Sikorsky S-92s, Sikorsky S-76s, Agusta Westland AW 139s, Eurocopter EC 135s, Bell 407s and Bell 206L-4s.  Bristow US is part of Bristow Group which is one of the largest commercial helicopter operators in the world.
 ERA flying Agusta A-119s, Eurocopter EC-135s, Sikorsky S-61s;
 PHI (Petroleum Helicopters Inc.) flying Bell JetRangers, Messerschmidt BO-105s, Eurocopter EC-135s, Sikorsky S-76s.

Lone Star Flight Museum 
The Lone Star Flight Museum, which was located at Scholes from 1985 until 2017, maintains a fleet of air worthy warbirds including: Vega B-17 Flying Fortress, North American B-25 Mitchell Bomber, Douglas SBD Dauntless, Republic P-47 Thunderbolt, Vought F4U Corsair, General Motors (Eastern Aircraft) TBM Avenger, Grumman F6F Hellcat, Grumman F8F Bearcat, General Motors FM-2 Wildcat, Supermarine Spitfire, Hawker Hurricane, North American AT-6 Texan, Beech AT-11 Kansan, Cessna AT-17 Bobcat, Stinson L-5, Douglas DC-3 Sky Train, and Stearman PT-17.

The Lone Star Flight Museum moved to nearby Ellington Airport in September 2017.

See also 

 Lone Star Flight Museum
 Texas World War II Army Airfields

References

External links 

 Scholes International Airport, official webpage
 Galveston Aviation Services, the fixed-base operator (FBO)
 Lone Star Flight Museum
  at Texas DOT Airport Directory
 Aerial image as of January 1995 from USGS The National Map
 
 

1931 establishments in Texas
Airfields of the United States Army Air Forces in Texas
Airports established in 1931
Galveston Army Air Field
Airports in Texas
Buildings and structures in Galveston, Texas
Tourist attractions in Galveston, Texas
Transportation in Galveston County, Texas
Transportation in Galveston, Texas